St. Nicholas Church is an Orthodox church in Novopyshminskoe village, Sverdlovsk Oblast.

The building was granted the status of regional significance on 31 December 1987 (decision № 535 by the executive committee of Sverdlovsk Oblast Council of People's Deputies). The object number of cultural heritage of regional significance is  661710820990005.

History 
The church is located on the left bank of the Pyshma River where earlier was entrance to the village. The parish was formed in 1752. It consisted of three villages: Sergulovka, Kazanskaya, Zaimskaya.

The wooden church was built in 1752. Only in 1835 the fundamental construction of a stone building started. The main part of the building was consecrated in the name of St. Nicholas. The side-altar was consecrated in the name of John the Evangelist in 1842.
The clergy of the parish consisted of a priest, a deacon and a psalmist. The priest had a public house in the village. The parish included a chapel in Novopyshminskoe village and a chapel in Kazanskaya village. A county school functioned in the village. Since 1893   a literacy school was opened in Sergulovka village.

The peal of bells were banned in 1934. The church was closed since 1937. The Orthodox parish has been organized in 1991. The same year the restoration of the church began. It was completed on 22 May 1998.

Architecture 
The stone church has a parallelepiped form with small ledges. It is supplemented by the same altar and refectory. The west part of the building is a bell tower.
The northern and the southern parts of the building are represented with four-columned porticos with pediments in Tuscan order style. Behind the columns between rectangular windows constructed pilasters. The dome drum is decorated with arched windows. Above the window openings are small horizontal niches. Altars and a refectory are timbered in a rustic style up to half height. Windows are triple, rectangular at the bottom with archivolt in the upper part.

The base of the bell tower decorated with a porticos the same as the church one. The spire is rising on the bell tower roof. 
Arc-shaped gates with two lobbies on the sides stood in its integrity.

References

Literature 
 
 
 

Tourist attractions in Sverdlovsk Oblast
Cultural heritage monuments of regional significance in Sverdlovsk Oblast
Churches in Sverdlovsk Oblast
Russian Orthodox church buildings in Russia